Luo Xin may refer to:
 Luo Xin (footballer, born 1990)
 Luo Xin (footballer, born 2000)